Coscinida lugubris is a species of comb-footed spider in the family Theridiidae. It is found in Tanzania.

References

Theridiidae
Spiders described in 1910